George Duncan Painter OBE (5 June 1914 – 8 December 2005), known as George D. Painter, was an English author most famous as a biographer of Marcel Proust.

Career
Painter was born in Birmingham, England. His father was a schoolmaster, and his mother was an artist. He studied classics at Trinity College, Cambridge, and later lectured in Latin at the University of Liverpool for one year. From 1938 until World War II and again after the war, he took a position as deputy curator of the British Museum's incunabula department.

His two-volume biography of Proust was published in 1959 and 1965.  According to Miron Grindea, this was "rightly greeted as one of the great achievements in literary history", and it is still widely considered to be one of the finest literary biographies in the English language. Its second volume won the Duff Cooper Prize. His later work Chateaubriand: Volume 1 – The Longed-For Tempests was awarded the 1977 James Tait Black Memorial Prize.

In popular culture
His poem "The Lobster" was adapted into a song by the English folk-rock band Fairport Convention, on their self-titled debut album.

Bibliography
1951: André Gide: a critical and biographical study London: Arthur Barker 
Revised and enlarged. London: Weidenfeld & Nicolson (1968)
Translations into French (1968) and Italian (1969)
1951: The Road to Sinodun: a winter and summer monodrama (poems) London: Rupert Hart-Davis
1953: André Gide: Marshlands and Prometheus Misbound: two satires. London: Secker & Warburg (translation)
1956: Marcel Proust: Letters to his Mother (translation) London: Rider
1959: Marcel Proust: a biography. Vol. 1. London: Chatto & Windus,  
1965: Marcel Proust: a biography. Vol. 2. London: Chatto & Windus
Translations into German (1962 & 1968), Italian (1965), French (1966), Spanish (1967), and Polish (1972)
1965: The Vinland Map and the Tartar Relation (with R. A. Skelton and Thomas E. Marston). New Haven: Yale University Press. Painter contributed: The Tartar Relation, edited, with introduction, translation and commentary; The Tartar Relation and the Vinland Map: an interpretation (New ed. New Haven: Yale University Press, 1995. )
1976: William Caxton: a quincentenary biography of England's first printer. London: Chatto & Windus, 
1977: Chateaubriand: a biography; Vol. 1: 1768–93; The longed-for tempests. London: Chatto & Windus,

References

External links
 "George Painter", Fellows Remembered, The Royal Society of Literature

1914 births
2005 deaths
People educated at King Edward VI Aston School
Academics of the University of Liverpool
English biographers
James Tait Black Memorial Prize recipients
Employees of the British Library
20th-century biographers
Officers of the Order of the British Empire